Charles Edward Arbuckle (born September 13, 1968) is an American football coach and former professional tight end in the National Football League (NFL). He was recently the tight ends coach for the Arizona Hotshots of the Alliance of American Football (AAF), a position he took in 2019. He was a two-time All-American while playing college football with the UCLA Bruins. He played four seasons for the Indianapolis Colts (1992–1995).  Arbuckle is a graduate of Willowridge High School (Houston) Class of 1986 and was one of the very successful group of football players that hail from Willowridge in the 1980s. He is also a color analyst for college football on ESPN College Football, ACCRSN and for college and NFL games on Sports USA radio.

References

External links

1968 births
Living people
American football tight ends
American radio sports announcers
American television sports announcers
Arizona Hotshots coaches
College football announcers
Indianapolis Colts players
National Football League announcers
People from Beaumont, Texas
Players of American football from Texas
UCLA Bruins football players